A cactus fence is a hedge or fence made of closely spaced cactus plants, sometimes with barbed wire or wood interwoven with the cacti.

Purpose 
Such fences are inexpensive to develop in regions where cacti are common, and can provide an extreme deterrent to any but a determined human intruder. Often their primary function is to keep wandering large animals off a private property.

Design 
Sometimes, cacti are used as barriers without being formed into a structured fence. Prickly pears (mostly Opuntia stricta) were imported into Australia in the 19th century for use as a natural agricultural fence and to establish a cochineal dye industry, but quickly became a widespread weed.

In the American southwest, ocotillo stems are often set in the ground to form a structure similar to a cactus fence.

References

 The cactus family, 2001, Edward F. Anderson, pp. 68–9.

Fences